Francesco Trivulzio (died 1631) was a Roman Catholic prelate who served as Bishop of Nocera de' Pagani (1621–1631).

Biography
Francesco Trivulzio was born ordained a priest in 1605.
On 29 March 1621, he was appointed during the papacy of Pope Paul V as Bishop of Nocera de' Pagani.
In April 1621, he was consecrated bishop by Giovanni Garzia Mellini, Cardinal-Priest of Santi Quattro Coronati. 
He served as Bishop of Nocera de' Pagani until his death on 22 August 1631.

References

External links and additional sources
 (for Chronology of Bishops) 
 (for Chronology of Bishops) 

17th-century Italian Roman Catholic bishops
Bishops appointed by Pope Paul V
1631 deaths